Eduard Bogdanov may refer to

 Eduard Bogdanov (footballer, born 1968), Russian footballer
 Eduard Bogdanov (footballer, born 1994), Russian footballer